DMV may refer to:
DMV (region) (for District of Columbia, Maryland, Virginia), or Washington metropolitan area
"DMV" (song), a song by Primus from Pork Soda
Department of motor vehicles, or Division of Motor Vehicles
Deserted medieval village, a class of settlement in the UK
Deutsche Mathematiker-Vereinigung, a German mathematical society
Deutscher Metallarbeiter-Verband, a German trade union
Deutscher Motorsport Verband, a German motor sport organisation
Dorsal nucleus of vagus nerve
Dual-mode vehicle
Dumpas language's ISO 639 code
Dynamic Management Views, a type of SQL view in the Microsoft SQL Server software